Fitzgerald's was one of the oldest and widely recognized live music venues in the Greater Houston area. The club has been at the top of the live music scene in Houston since it opened in 1977. Fitzgerald's is commonly referred to as "Fitz.” Fitzgerald’s closed and the 100-year-old building was demolished in 2019. A parking lot was built in its place.

History
Fitzgerald's was built in 1918, and for over half a century it was home to the Dom Polski, a Polish center and dance hall. In 1977, G.B. FitzGerald took over the property and opened one of Houston's oldest and best known live music venues.  Shake Russell and Dana Cooper were regular performers at the venue in the late 70s. Sara FitzGerald took over operation of the venue after his death on September 15, 1980.  The building and business was leased from September 2010 until Jan 2016. Sara Fitzgerald took over the reins again in early 2016. The final show was December 31, 2018.

Artist

Fitzgerald's boasted two fully equipped event rooms — one upstairs and one downstairs (often referred to by locals as "Zelda's") — both complete with stage, professional sound and lights, and two premium stocked bars.
The stages at Fitzgerald's have seen thousands of up-and-coming acts, regionally successful artists, and national tours come across them over the years. Kayote, ZZ Top, David Allan Coe, James Brown, Etta James, Dennis Miller and many more helped get things off the ground in the late 70s and early 80s. R.E.M., The Ramones, Cross Canadian Ragweed, Mr. Bungle, Sonic Youth, Godsmack, Soundgarden, Weezer, Tina Turner, Mudvayne, Blues Traveler, Butthole Surfers, Insane Clown Posse, L7, Nonpoint, Devin the Dude, Iron & Wine, Dillinger Escape Plan, EOTO, Aesop Rock, The Books, Staind, AFI, Sleater-Kinney, KRS-One, The Black Lips, The Donnas, DRI, Stevie Ray Vaughan, Bun B, Tim and Eric Awesome Show, Great Job!, Os Mutantes, Foals, Tomahawk, Big Boi, Run the Jewels, Dresden Dolls, Warpaint, Del the Funky Homosapien, Man Man, Uh Huh Her, The Raveonettes, Pansy Division, Fantômas, Yelle, Prince Paul, OK Go, The Walkmen, Andy Dick, The Misfits, UK Subs, Death, Lucero, Man or Astroman?, Theophilus London, The Jesus Lizard, Daniel Johnston, Cracker, The Sword, MC Chris, Voodoo Glow Skulls, Peelander-Z, Toro y Moi, CocoRosie, Clara C, Omar Rodriguez Lopez, The Oh Sees, Yann Tiersen, Anamanaguchi, The Drums, 30 Foot Fall, Strife, Murder City Devils, Mindscape, The Fierce Goodbye, and hundreds of other now nationally recognized rock, country, hip-hop, and blues artists have all had their turn on the stages of Fitzgerald's.  Several successful Texas bands such as Blue October, Canvas, Ian Moore, Johnny Goudie, SouthFM, Nothing Sacred, and Vallejo played their early shows at Fitzgerald's.

External links
Aftermath of a Fitzgerald's riot in 1990
The Jesus Lizard at Fitzgerald's
When We Ruled H-Town News Spot

References

Music venues in Houston
Culture of Houston
Demolished buildings and structures in Houston
Buildings and structures demolished in 2019